Woodies may refer to:

 The Woodies, nickname given to men's tennis doubles team whose members were Todd Woodbridge and Mark Woodforde
  Woodies (Woodies Safe Dreams), manufacturer of certified baby beds and nursery furniture
 Woodie's DIY, an Irish DIY store chain operated by the Grafton Group
 MTV Woodies, a music awards show by college channel mtvU
 Woodward & Lothrop, a defunct department store
 Woodies, another name for Cuisenaire rods
 Woodies, a nickname for Woodbine cigarettes
 Woodroofe, a South Australian soft drink brandname and historic company

See also 

 
 Woodie (disambiguation)
 Woody (disambiguation)
 Woody's (disambiguation)
 Woods (disambiguation)